Louis Washington Turpin (February 22, 1849 – February 3, 1903) was a U.S. Representative from Alabama.

Born in Charlottesville, Virginia, When his parents both died, he moved to Alabama with his sister and settled in Perry County in 1858.
He was Self-educated.
He engaged in agricultural pursuits.
Tax assessor of Hale County in 1873–1880.
He served as chairman of the Democratic committee of Hale County for six years.
He was an unsuccessful candidate for nomination to the Forty-eighth Congress.
Presented credentials as a Democratic Member-elect to the Fifty-first Congress and served from March 4, 1889, to June 4, 1890, when he was succeeded by John V. McDuffie, who contested his election.

Turpin was elected to the Fifty-second and Fifty-third Congresses (March 4, 1891 – March 3, 1895).
He was an unsuccessful candidate for renomination.
He retired from politics and engaged in planting.
He died in Greensboro, Alabama, February 3, 1903.
He was interred in the City Cemetery.

References

External links

1849 births
1903 deaths
Democratic Party members of the United States House of Representatives from Alabama
19th-century American politicians